The Access Group is a British software company based in Loughborough, England. It was founded in 1991, and currently has more than 5,000 employees.  It provides business management software to over 47,000 organisations across the UK and Asian-Pacific region. Turnover was £480 million in the year to June 2021 - a year in which it completed 18 acquisitions.

The company is a supplier of many IT solutions, including care management software, recruitment CRM systems, Payroll Systems to name only a couple.  Its systems are used by more than 8,000 registered care providers. It acquired Servelec in 2021.  It assists care providers to invest in apprenticeships and training.  In 2020 it ran an online hub to help care providers to identify and monitor people showing symptoms of COVID-19.

It acquired Trailsuite Limited in 2021.  It runs an app used primarily in the hospitality and leisure sector which allows businesses to run a paperless workplace with checklists, record logs and integrations.

It acquired Sage Group’s local businesses in Asia and Australia in June 2021,  and Definitiv, a cloud payroll and Human Resources platform in August 2021, and Vincere, a provider of recruitment software for staffing agencies in January 2022.

The company supports charities to improve the accessibility of their websites,  and to get and retain Google Ad Grants.

It offers legal practice management software through its subsidiary, Eclipse Legal Systems.

In May 2022, the Access Group announced it would acquire Australian company Reckon's Accountants Group for A$100 million. The deal included Reckon's APS and Reckon Elite software. The acquisition was completed in August 2022.

On 8 June 2022, the Access Group published an article stating that they had secured further investment from their principle shareholders, Hg and TA Associates. The new investment has seen the company valuation rise to £9.2 billion making the Access Group the largest UK headquartered software provider.

References

Software companies of the United Kingdom
Companies based in Loughborough